John Buyers was the first officer of the brig Barwell in 1799 on her voyage to China. Later he was the first officer of the brig Margaret as an investment he and John Turnbull made in Turnbull and Co., John Turnbull being his second officer and a historian. Margaret, after some delay, left England on July 2, 1800, and sailing by way of the Cape of Good Hope, reached Sydney in February 1801. They reached the Society Islands in September 1802. After trading with various islands in the group, the ship sailed for the Hawaiian Islands, arriving at Oahu on December 17. After trading for salt at Oahu, Kauai, Niihau, and Hawaii island, Margaret sailed south on January 21, 1803. The ship sailed in among the Tuamotuan atolls and, on March 6, 1803, Nukutepipi, one of the Duke of Gloucester Islands, was visited and named Margaret Island, after the ship, though previously discovered in 1767. On March 10, Makemo was discovered and named Phillips Island, after a late sheriff of London, Sir Richard Phillips. On the same day, Taenga was discovered and named Holts Island. Some other islands were sighted but they had been previously discovered and were not landed on. Once in Tahiti, Turnbull set up an establishment ashore for buying pigs and salting them down with the salt obtained in the Hawaiian Islands.

Margaret, under Buyers, set out to trade for hogs with the neighboring islands, but ran onto a reef in the Palliser Islands and was wrecked. Buyers and his crew, after considerable hardship, managed to reach Tahiti on a roughly constructed barge made of planks from the wreck. A ship which called at Tahiti afforded passage to Sydney for both Turnbull and Buyers. They left Sydney on 16 March 1804, in Calcutta and reached England via Cape Horn. Though a financial failure, the voyage obtained interesting information about the Society and Hawaiian Islands and the discovery of the islands Margaret, Phillips, and Holt in the Tuamotu Archipelago.

References

External links

British sailors
Hawaiian Kingdom
Year of death missing
Year of birth missing